= Elakolanu =

Eelakolanu Eelagollu
- Village
- Interactive map of Eelakolanu
- Location in Andhra Pradesh, India Eelakolanu (India)
- Coordinates: 17.0375749°N 81.94939°E
- Country: India
- State: Andhra Pradesh
- District: East Godavari

Government
  - Type: Panchayat

Area
  - Total: 5 km^{2} (1.9 sq mi)

Population
  - Total: 5,000 (approx)
  - Density: 1,000/km^{2} (2,600/sq mi)

Telugu
  - Official: Telugu
- Time zone: UTC+5:30 (IST)
- Postal code: 533294
- Vehicle registration: AP

Eelakolanu is a village located 20 kilometers from Rajahmundry in Andhra Pradesh, India. It is knowns for mangoes and cashews, and is in close proximity to National Highway 5, ADB road and Rajahmundry airport, and engineering and medical colleges. Its land can be used for several multiples purpose like farming, housing, and industrial. Due to this, real estate is in booming and land prices are soaring.

== Geography ==
Eelakolanu is a village in Rangampeta Mandal in the East Godavari District of Andhra Pradesh State, India. It belongs to the Andhra region. It is located 37 km west of district headquarters Kakinada, 6 km from Rangampeta, 180 km from the state capital Amaravati and 180 km from Visakhapatnam, and has connecting roads to all major towns in East Godavari.

Eelakolanu Pin code is 533294 and postal head office is Rajanagaram.

Dontamuru (4 km), Kanavaram (2 km), Chakra dwara bandham( 3 km), Rangampeta (5 km), Mukundavaram (2 km) are the nearby villages. Peddapuram, Raja Mahendra varam, Samarlakota, anaparti, Mandapeta, Kakinada, Madhurapudi, Ramachandrapuram are nearby towns.

== Nearby colleges and universities ==
The colleges located in and around Rajanagaram are Godavari Institute of Engineering and Technology, Aadikavi Nannaya University, Aditya Engineering College, Lenora Institute of Dental Sciences, GSL Medical College and General Hospital, GSL College of Nursing, and Pragati Engineering College.

== Demographics ==
The population of Elakolanu is about 5000. Males are 2600 and females are 2400, living in 1310 houses. The geographic area is 2381 hectares. Telugu is the local language.
